The England cricket team toured the Netherlands in June 2022 to play three One Day International (ODI) matches, which formed part of the inaugural 2020–2023 ICC Cricket World Cup Super League. Originally, the tour was scheduled to take place in May 2021, but it was postponed due to the COVID-19 pandemic. All of the matches took place at the VRA Cricket Ground in Amstelveen, and was the first bilateral series between the two sides.

The matches were played between the second and third Test matches that England played against New Zealand. Netherlands captain Pieter Seelaar commented on his frustration of several players being unavailable for the national team due to their commitments in the T20 Blast.

In the first ODI, England were put into bat and went on to score the highest innings total in an ODI match, with 498/4 from their 50 overs. England also broke the highest total in a List A cricket match, surpassing the 496/4 that Surrey made in the 2007 Friends Provident Trophy. England then bowled the Netherlands out for 266 to win the match by 232 runs. Pieter Seelaar was ruled out of the second ODI due to a back injury, and he later announced his retirement from international cricket, with Scott Edwards captaining the team for the last two matches. England won the second ODI by six wickets, after the match was reduced to 41 overs per side due to a wet outfield, to win the series with a match to play. Prior to the third and final ODI, England's captain Eoin Morgan was ruled out of the match with a groin injury, with Jos Buttler named as the team's captain in his place. England won the third and final match by eight wickets to win the series 3–0. Six days after the end of the series, Eoin Morgan announced his retirement from international cricket.

Squads

Paul van Meekeren and Fred Klaassen were added to the Dutch squad for the third ODI.

ODI series

1st ODI

2nd ODI

3rd ODI

Notes

References

External links
 Series home at ESPN Cricinfo

2022 in English cricket
2022 in Dutch cricket
International cricket competitions in 2022
English cricket tours of the Netherlands
Cricket events postponed due to the COVID-19 pandemic